Selmice is a municipality and village in Pardubice District in the Pardubice Region of the Czech Republic. It has about 100 inhabitants. The area of the village is included in the Landscape for Breeding and Training of Ceremonial Carriage Horses at Kladruby nad Labem, a UNESCO World Heritage Site.

References

External links

Villages in Pardubice District